Adivasah is an upper garment of Vedic times clothing; It is a type of over garment similar to a mantle or cloak. Vedas refers  (dress) as a set of clothes with these two main components where Vasa is for the lower body and Adivasa for the upper body.

Name 
Adivasah is a Sanskrit word (which means a long coat.

Use 
Princes wore Adivasah. On special occasions, such as religious ceremonies,  was a must. a set of Vasa (Vastra or Vasana) for the lower body, Adivasah as upper/over garment, Uttariya for the upper body. Most of these clothes were common for men and women with distinctive wearing and draping styles. Vedic time Aryans were used to dress formally in these garments and sometimes embellished with gold.

See also 

 Uttariya an upper body garment.
 Antariya a lower body garment.
 Kanchuka
 Vedas
 Tarpaya
 Vadhuya

References 

Hindu religious clothing
Indian clothing